The 1995 Guerrero earthquake occurred on September 14, 1995, at 14:04 UTC (08:04 local time). This earthquake had a magnitude of  7.4, with the epicenter being located in the state of Guerrero, Mexico. Three people were reported dead. In the rural part of southeast Guerrero, many houses with adobe of poor quality suffered heavier damage. The intensity in Copala reached MM VII. The earthquake could be felt strongly along the coast from Michoacán to Chiapas.

The earthquake occurred in the region of the Middle America Trench. It was an interplate earthquake. It had a reverse faulting focal mechanism.

See also
 List of earthquakes in 1995
 List of earthquakes in Mexico

References

External links

1995 earthquakes
Earthquakes in Mexico
History of Guerrero
1995 in Mexico
1995 disasters in Mexico